Sacodes is a genus of marsh beetles in the family Scirtidae. There are about seven described species in Sacodes.

Species
These seven species belong to the genus Sacodes:
 Sacodes elongata Yoshitomi, 2012 g
 Sacodes fuscipennis (Guérin-Méneville, 1843) i c g b
 Sacodes humeralis (Yoshitomi & Sato, 1996) g
 Sacodes leei Yoshitomi & Satô, 2004 g
 Sacodes pulchella (Guérin-Méneville, 1843) i c g b (beautiful marsh beetle)
 Sacodes taiwanensis (Yoshitomi & Sato, 1996) g
 Sacodes thoracica (Guérin-Méneville, 1843) i c g b
Data sources: i = ITIS, c = Catalogue of Life, g = GBIF, b = Bugguide.net

References

Further reading

External links

 

Scirtoidea
Articles created by Qbugbot